Michael Morton (born 7 March 1989 in Randburg, Gauteng) is a South African football (soccer) player who plays as a midfielder for Cape Town Spurs in the Premier Soccer League.

Club career
Morton started his professional career in 2008/2009 season with Orlando Pirates. Morton spent the 2009/2010 and 2010/2011 seasons on loan at Bidvest Wits, and moved on to join Maritzburg United on a permanent basis from 2011 - 2014.

Morton signed a pre-contract with Supersport United F.C. in January 2014, which saw him join the team for the 2014/2015 season. He spent 3 years at the club (2014/2015; 2015/2016; 2016/2017), before moving on a loan deal to AmaZulu in 2017. Following his contract with Supersport United expiring, Morton signed permanently with AmaZulu.

Honours

Nedbank Cup
Winner: 2009/2010 (with Bidvest Wits); 2015/2016; 2016/2017(with Supersport United)

Telkom Cup
 Winner: 2014/2015 (with Supersport United)
 Runner-up: 2016/2017(with Supersport United)

Minor cups

Gauteng Cup
 Winner: 2014; 2016;

Nedbank Ke Yona Cup
 Winner: 2016

References

External links
 

1989 births
Living people
People from Randburg
South African people of British descent
South African soccer players
Association football defenders
Association football midfielders
Bidvest Wits F.C. players
Orlando Pirates F.C. players
White South African people
Maritzburg United F.C. players
SuperSport United F.C. players
Cape Umoya United F.C. players
Cape Town All Stars players
Cape Town Spurs F.C. players
Soccer players from Gauteng